Masato Domeki (百目木政人), born December 29, 1983, is a Japanese professional ice hockey forward currently playing for the Hokkaido Red Eagles of the Asia League.

Since 2003 he plays for the Hokkaido Red Eagles (formerly Oji Eagles). He also played in the Japan national team at junior level in 2003, and currently, for the seniors national team (since 2006).

References

Oji Eagle's players profile

1983 births
People from Eniwa, Hokkaido
Japanese ice hockey forwards
Living people
Oji Eagles players
Asian Games gold medalists for Japan
Asian Games silver medalists for Japan
Medalists at the 2007 Asian Winter Games
Medalists at the 2011 Asian Winter Games
Ice hockey players at the 2007 Asian Winter Games
Ice hockey players at the 2011 Asian Winter Games
Asian Games medalists in ice hockey